Rudolph "Bobby" Selk (6 October 1871 – 31 January 1940) was an Australian cricketer. He played 16 first-class matches for Western Australia between 1898-99 and 1912-13.

Life and career
Bobby Selk moved from Benalla in Victoria to Western Australia during the 1895-96 cricket season, and between then and the 1910-11 season he took 777 wickets in senior cricket in Perth at an average of 9.31. When he retired in 1918 he had taken 959 wickets. He was a right-arm bowler, generally bowling medium-paced off-spin: "With a big variety of paces, turning from both sides, with a fine command of length and bowling that impossible ball which 'fizzes' off the pitch and comes back from three to four inches, 'Bobby' was always likely to bowl the best of batsmen 'neck and crop' as the cricket phrase goes." 

Selk took 5 for 19 and 7 for 108 when Western Australia beat South Australia in 1905-06. His best first-class performance was in Western Australia's victory over Victoria in 1909-10, when he took 8 for 28 and 5 for 49. His match figures of 13 for 77 in this match remained a West Australian record for 71 years until Terry Alderman took 14 for 87. He was named in an All-Time Western Australia XI by the Western Australian Cricket Association in 1951.

After a career in the postal service Selk retired to an orchard property at Pickering Brook on the eastern fringes of Perth. He died there in 1940 aged 68, leaving a widow and two sons and a daughter.

See also
 List of Western Australia first-class cricketers

References

External links
 

1871 births
1940 deaths
People from Omeo
Australian cricketers
Western Australia cricketers